This article serves as an index – as complete as possible – of all the honorific orders or similar decorations awarded by Kedah, classified by Monarchies chapter and Republics chapter, and, under each chapter, recipients' countries and the detailed list of recipients.

Awards

Monarchies

Kedah Royal Family 

 Sultanah Haminah of Kedah (2nd wife of the late Sultan) 
  Member of the Royal Family Order of Kedah (DK, 9.1.2004), 
  Member of the Halimi Family Order of Kedah (DKH, 16.7.2008) 
  Member of the Supreme Order of Sri Mahawangsa (DMK, 20.1.2017) 
 Tunku Intan Safinaz, Tunku Temenggong (Sultan Abdul Halim of Kedah and Tuanku Bahiyah's daughter and member of the Regency Council 2011) 
  Member of the Halimi Family Order of Kedah (DKH, 16.7.2008) 				 
  Knight Grand Companion of the Order of Loyalty to the Royal House of Kedah (SSDK, 28.11.1988) with title Dato' Seri
  Grand Commander of the Order of Sultan 'Abdu'l Halim Mu'azzam Shah (SHMS, 12.12.2011) with title Dato' Seri Di Raja 
  Justice of the Peace of Kedah (JP, 19.1.2004) 
 Tunku Soraya (Sultan Abdul Halim of Kedah and Tuanku Bahiyah's adoptive daughter)  
  Knight Grand Companion of the Order of Loyalty to the Royal House of Kedah (SSDK) with title Dato' Seri 		
  Grand Commander of the Order of Sultan 'Abdu'l Halim Mu'azzam Shah (SHMS, 17.7.2008) with title Dato' Seri Di Raja
 Noor Suzanna, Former Toh Puan Bendahara was awarded:
  Knight Grand Companion of the Order of Loyalty to the Royal House of Kedah (SSDK, 12.12.2011) with title Dato' Seri
 Sultan Sallehuddin of Kedah (3rd younger brother of the late Sultan and member of the Regency Council 2011):
  Founding Grand Master and Member of the Royal Family Order of Kedah (DK)
  Founding Grand Master of the Supreme Order of Sri Mahawangsa (DMK)
  Knight Grand Companion of the Order of Loyalty to the Royal House of Kedah (SSDK) with title Dato' Seri
  Grand Commander of the Order of Sultan 'Abdu'l Halim Mu'azzam Shah (SHMS, 17.7.2008) with title Dato' Seri Di Raja
  The State of Kedah Distinguished Service Star (BCK)
   Mentioned in dispatches (KPK)
 His wife, Tuanku Maliha, Sultanah Kedah
  Founding Grand Master and Member of the Royal Family Order of Kedah (DK, 21.1.2018)
  Knight Grand Companion of the Order of Loyalty to the Royal House of Kedah (SSDK, 12.12.2011) with title Dato' Seri
 Their son, Tengku Sarafuddin Badlishah, Raja Muda
  Member of the Supreme Order of Sri Mahawangsa (DMK, 26.11.2017)
  Knight Companion of the Order of Loyalty to the Royal House of Kedah (DSDK) with title Dato Tunku Abdul Hamid Thani, Tunku Bendahara (4th younger brother of the late Sultan and member of the Regency Council 2011):
 Order of Loyalty to the Royal House of Kedah :
  Knight Grand Companion (SSDK, 17.1.2004) with title Dato' Seri
  Knight Companion (DSDK, 28.11.1991) with title Dato  Grand Commander of the Order of Sultan 'Abdu'l Halim Mu'azzam Shah (SHMS, 17.7.2008) with title Dato' Seri Di Raja
 Tunku Hosnah (3rd daughter of Sultan Badlishah of Kedah)
  Knight Grand Companion of the Order of Loyalty to the Royal House of Kedah (SSDK, 12.12.2011) with title Dato' Seri
 Tunku Bisharah (4th daughter of Sultan Badlishah of Kedah)
  Knight Companion of the Order of Loyalty to the Royal House of Kedah (DSDK, 20.1.2008) with title Dato'''
  Companion of the Order of Loyalty to Sultan 'Abdu'l Halim Mu'azzam Shah (SMS)
 Tunku Badriat (5th daughter of Sultan Badlishah of Kedah)
  Knight Companion of the Order of Loyalty to the Royal House of Kedah (DSDK, 20.1.2008) with title Dato
 Tunku Kamaliah (6th daughter of Sultan Badlishah of Kedah)
  Knight Companion of the Order of Loyalty to the Royal House of Kedah (DSDK, 21.1.2007) with title Dato
 Tunku Nafisah (7th daughter of Sultan Badlishah of Kedah)
  Knight Companion of the Order of Loyalty to the Royal House of Kedah (DSDK,21.1.2007) with title Dato'  Companion of the Order of Loyalty to Sultan 'Abdu'l Halim Mu'azzam Shah (SMS, 21.1.2002)

 STATES of MALAYSIA 

  Johor Royal Family 
They have been awarded :To be completed if any ...  Kelantan Royal Family 
 Sultan Ismail Petra of Kelantan, Sultan Muhammad V of Kelantan's father and retired Sultan for illness :
  Member of the Royal Family Order of Kedah (DK)
 Tengku Muhammad Faiz Petra :
  Founding Grand Master of the Supreme Order of Sri Mahawangsa (DMK, 30.9.2017)

  Negeri Sembilan Royal Family 
 Tuanku Muhriz of Negeri Sembilan : 
  Member of the Royal Family Order of Kedah (DK, 17.1.2010)
 Tuanku Najihah, widow of late Yang di-Pertuan Besar Jaafar of Negeri Sembilan :
  Member of the Royal Family Order of Kedah (DK)

  Pahang Royal Family 
 Sultan Ahmad Shah of Pahang :
  Member of the Royal Family Order of Kedah (DK)

  Perlis Royal Family 
 Sultan Sirajuddin of Perlis (Yang di-Pertuan Agong of Malaysia, 12/2001 - 12/2006) :
  Member of the Royal Family Order of Kedah (DK, 21.1.2002)

  Selangor Royal Family 
 Sultan Sharafuddin of Selangor :
  Member of the Royal Family Order of Kedah (DK)

  Terengganu Royal Family 
 Sultan Mizan Zainal Abidin of Terengganu (Sultan : since 15 May 1998 - Y.d-P.A. 12/2006-12/2011) 
  Member of the Royal Family Order of Kedah (DK, 21.1.2002)
 Sultanah Nur Zahirah : 
  Member of the Royal Family Order of Kedah (DK)

  Governors of Penang 

 Abdul Rahman Abbas (Governor of Penang :  - present) :
  Member of the Supreme Order of Sri Mahawangsa (DMK)To be completed if any other ... ASIAN MONARCHIESto be completed EUROPEAN MONARCHIESto be completed ... Former Monarchies to be completed ... Republics to be completed''

See also 
 Mirror page : List of honours of the Kedah Royal Family by country

References 

 
Kedah